Eristalis flavipes, the orange-legged drone fly, is a species of hoverfly native to North America. It flies from early April to mid-October, and occurs in a wide variety of habitats, particularly wetlands. Hoverflies get their names from the ability to remain nearly motionless while in flight. The adults are also known as flower flies for they are commonly found around and on flowers, from which they get both energy-giving nectar and protein-rich pollen. The larvae are aquatic filter-feeders of the rat-tailed type.

Description
Eristalis flavipes strongly like bumblebees
For terms see Morphology of Diptera.
Length  13 to 17 mm.

Head
The face, cheeks (gena) and facial stripe are shining black with short yellow pile. The antennae are dark brown and plumose basally. The eyes are broadly contiguous in the male, with eye pile confined mostly to a vertical stripe.
Thorax
The mesonotum, pleurae, and scutellum, with very abundant, long, bright yellow pile over shining black except the center of the nearly hairless  mesonotum. The scutellum is wholly light yellow.

Abdomen
The abdomen is a deep shining black with the second segment dark red and covered with long black hairs with some yellow hairs intermixed.

Wings
The wings are hyaline with luteous veins. The female has a large brown spot at the  central part of wing. The wing veination: includes a sinuous r4+5 vein, a closed cell r1. The  anterior cross- vein (r-m)  is oblique and near the middle of discal cell (dm).

Legs
The legs are deep black, with black pile. Joints are  reddish the  anterior tarsi are brown, the middle and posterior tarsi are light reddish-yellow. The hind femora are somewhat elongate. The hind tibiae are  bent.

References

Further reading
 
 Eristalis (Diptera: Syrphidae) from America North of Mexico, Telford H.S. 1970. Ann. Ent. Soc. Am. 63(5): 1201–1210.

External links

Eristalinae
Insects described in 1849